Trimble is a village in Trimble Township, Athens County, Ohio, United States. The population was 390 at the 2010 census.

History
Trimble village was originally called Oxford. A post office called Trimble has been in operation since 1839. The present name is derived from Allen Trimble, 8th & 10th Governor of Ohio.

Geography
Trimble is located at  (39.485312, -82.079094), along Sunday Creek.

Trimble is one of three bordering incorporated villages in northern Athens County, all of which began as coal mining towns. Just north of Trimble is Glouster, and just south of Trimble is Jacksonville.

Demographics

2010 census
As of the census of 2010, there were 390 people, 145 households, and 103 families living in the village. The racial makeup of the village was 97.4% White, 0.3% Native American, and 2.3% from two or more races.

There were 145 households, of which 34.5% had children under the age of 18 living with them, 47.6% were married couples living together, 17.9% had a female householder with no husband present, 5.5% had a male householder with no wife present, and 29.0% were non-families. 20.7% of all households were made up of individuals, and 7.6% had someone living alone who was 65 years of age or older. The average household size was 2.69 and the average family size was 3.04.

The median age in the village was 39.5 years. 22.8% of residents were under the age of 18; 11.6% were between the ages of 18 and 24; 24% were from 25 to 44; 25.6% were from 45 to 64; and 15.9% were 65 years of age or older. The gender makeup of the village was 52.3% male and 47.7% female.

2000 census
As of the census of 2000, there were 466 people, 175 households, and 121 families living in the village. The population density was 713.1 people per square mile (276.8/km). There were 195 housing units at an average density of 298.4 per square mile (115.8/km). The racial makeup of the village was 98.50% White, 0.21% Asian, and 1.29% from two or more races.

There were 175 households, out of which 38.3% had children under the age of 18 living with them, 49.1% were married couples living together, 17.1% had a female householder with no husband present, and 30.3% were non-families. 22.9% of all households were made up of individuals, and 10.3% had someone living alone who was 65 years of age or older. The average household size was 2.66 and the average family size was 3.14.

In the village, the population was spread out, with 30.7% under the age of 18, 9.4% from 18 to 24, 27.3% from 25 to 44, 23.8% from 45 to 64, and 8.8% who were 65 years of age or older. The median age was 33 years. For every 100 females there were 99.1 males. For every 100 females age 18 and over, there were 86.7 males.

The median income for a household in the village was $30,500, and the median income for a family was $30,938. Males had a median income of $29,107 versus $21,667 for females. The per capita income for the village was $11,437. About 22.0% of families and 26.1% of the population were below the poverty line, including 30.8% of those under age 18 and 21.6% of those age 65 or over.

References

Villages in Athens County, Ohio
Villages in Ohio
1839 establishments in Ohio
Populated places established in 1839